Uloceras is a genus of early nautiloid named by Zhuravleva in 1974, that lived during the middle Devonian

References

 Jack Sepkoski, 2000. List of Cephalopoda genera
 Uloceras in Fossilworks  10-q5-2014

Prehistoric nautiloid genera